Mandaibazar is one of the 60 Legislative Assembly constituencies of Tripura state in India. It is in West Tripura district and is reserved for candidates belonging to the Scheduled Tribes. It is also part of West Tripura Lok Sabha constituency.

Members of Legislative Assembly

Election results

2018

See also
List of constituencies of the Tripura Legislative Assembly
 West Tripura district
 Mandaibazar
 Tripura West (Lok Sabha constituency)

References

West Tripura district
Assembly constituencies of Tripura